Llandrindod Wells County War Memorial Hospital is a health facility in Temple Street, Llandrindod Wells, Powys, Wales. It is managed by the Powys Teaching Health Board.

History
The facility was opened as the Llandrindod Wells Cottage Hospital and Convalescent Home in 1881. In order to commemorate the lives of local service personnel who had died in the First World War, it was renamed the Llandrindod Wells Hospital and County War Memorial in 1924 and joined the National Health Service as the Llandrindod Wells County War Memorial Hospital in 1948. A new 16-bed renal unit opened at the hospital in spring 2012 and a new Ithon birthing unit opened there in spring 2017.

References

Hospitals in Powys
Hospitals established in 1881
1881 establishments in Wales
Hospital buildings completed in 1881
NHS hospitals in Wales
Powys Teaching Health Board
Llandrindod Wells